Jay Belsky (born July 7, 1952) is an American child psychologist and the Robert M. and Natalie Reid Dorn Professor of Human Development at the University of California, Davis. He is noted for his research in the fields of child development and family studies. He was a founding investigator of the NICHD Study of Early Child Care and Youth Development in the United States, and of the National Evaluation of Sure Start in the United Kingdom. He has been an ISI Highly Cited Researcher since 2002.

Career
After receiving his Ph.D. from Cornell University in 1978, Belsky joined the faculty of Penn State University, where he became a distinguished professor of human development before leaving the faculty there in 1999. From 1999 to 2010, he was a professor of psychology at Birkbeck University of London, where he was also the founding director of the Institute for the Study of Children, Families and Social Issues. He became the Robert M. and Natalie Reid Dorn Professor of Human Development at the University of California, Davis in 2011. Since 2010, he has been a member of the Academy of Europe.

Research
Belsky has published multiple studies reporting that child care is associated with an increased risk of psychological and behavioral problems for children. These studies have been covered extensively by the media, though they have been criticized by other researchers. One such critic, Kathleen McCartney, former director of the Child Study and Development Center at the University of New Hampshire and dean of the Harvard Graduate School of Education, said in 1987 that "None of the studies Jay [Belsky] talks about look at the quality of child-care arrangements or the family backgrounds".

References

External links

1952 births
Living people
American developmental psychologists
University of California, Davis faculty
Scientists from New York City
Cornell University alumni
Child psychologists
Academics of Birkbeck, University of London
Pennsylvania State University faculty
Members of Academia Europaea
American child psychologists